is a former Japanese football player.

Playing career
Kuboyama was born in Yaizu on July 21, 1976. After graduating from Shizuoka Gakuen High School, he joined Yokohama Flügels in 1995. Although he debuted in first season, he could hardly play in the match until 1997. In late 1998, he became a regular player as forward and the club won the champions Emperor's Cup. At the Final, he scored a goal against Shimizu S-Pulse. However the club was disbanded end of 1998 season due to financial strain, he moved to his local club Shimizu S-Pulse in 1999. He played as regular player for a long time. In 1999 season, he scored 12 goals and the club won the 2nd place in J1 League. The club won the champions 1999–2000 Asian Cup Winners' Cup and 2001 Emperor's Cup. However he could not play at all in the match for injury in 2007 and he retired end of 2007 season.

Coaching career
After retirement, Kuboyama started coaching career at Shimizu S-Pulse in 2008. He served as manager for youth team until 2015. In 2016, he became a coach for top team.

Club statistics

References

External links

1976 births
Living people
Association football people from Shizuoka Prefecture
Japanese footballers
J1 League players
Yokohama Flügels players
Shimizu S-Pulse players
People from Yaizu, Shizuoka
Association football forwards